Nicholas Dyson is Professor of Medicine at Harvard Medical School, the James and Shirley Curvey MGH Research Scholar and Scientific Director of the Massachusetts General Hospital Cancer Center.

Research
The Dyson Lab studies the retinoblastoma protein.

Working as a post-doctoral fellow in the laboratory of Dr. Ed Harlow, Dyson demonstrated that the retinoblastoma protein can form complexes in vitro with the E7 oncoprotein of Human papilloma virus type-16.  This result implicated pRB binding to E7 as a step in human papilloma virus-associated carcinogenesis.

More recently, Dyson's group has shown that the transcription factor E2F1 is a potent and specific inhibitor of beta-catenin/T-cell factor (TCF)-dependent transcription, and that this function contributes to E2F1-induced apoptosis.

As of 2015, Professor Dyson has 140 publications in leading peer-reviewed journals.

References

Year of birth missing (living people)
Living people
American geneticists
Harvard Medical School faculty